Meadowlark (Edmonton) may refer to:

 Edmonton-Meadowlark, electoral district in Edmonton, Alberta, Canada
 Meadowlark Park, Edmonton, residential neighbourhood in west Edmonton, Alberta, Canada
 West Meadowlark Park, Edmonton, residential neighbourhood in west Edmonton, Alberta, Canada